Dundrum F.C. are a football team from Dundrum, Dublin. The senior team plays in the Leinster Senior League Non-Intermediate Division 3. The club play their home games at the Meadowbrook Leisure Centre, Meadowbrook. The clubs underage teams play in the Dublin & District Schoolboys League and South Dublin Football League.  The club also fields a Women's senior team and a Girls' U18 team.

External links
Dundrum website

Leinster Senior League (association football) clubs
Association football clubs in Dún Laoghaire–Rathdown
1973 establishments in Ireland